John Stephens Orr (6 March 1907 – 1990) was a 20th-century Scottish Glasgow photographer with an interest in people and motor cars. Practising between 1930 and 1970 in Glasgow's Langside and later at No. 4 Somerset Place, Charing Cross, he became known for his portraits of society figures in magazines such as Scottish Field.

His usual subjects were judges posing in full regalia, antidisestablishmentarianism lawyers, Duchesses and controversial music hall characters.  Orr also photographed some internationally famous celebrities and captains of industry, all visitors to Glasgow. Here is a small selection of personalities that he photographed:

 Paul Robeson — U.S. vocalist and black activist
 Dame Marie Rambert — Polish dancer and choreographer; founder of Ballet Rambert
 Marc Chagall — Jewish painter
 Richard Burton — Welsh actor
 Stanley Baxter — Scottish comedian
 Jacques Tati — French film maker
 Paul Tortelier — French cellist
 David Brown, Aston Martin cars
 William Lyons, Jaguar, Austin cars
 Walter Owen Bentley, Rolls-Royce/Bentley cars
 Nicholas Fairbairn — Scottish lawyer and British politician

Orr wore a distinctive kilt and was photographed in a portrait style similar to Yousuf Karsh. He recorded the last glimmers of a confident Scottish society in flamboyant style. His later life was spent with his wife, Jenny, on the Scottish Clyde coast island of Cumbrae.

He died in Cumbrae, aged 83.

References

1990 deaths
1907 births
Scottish photographers
People from Govan
Date of death missing